Katanga was one of the four large provinces created in the Belgian Congo in 1914.
It was one of the eleven provinces of the Democratic Republic of the Congo between 1966 and 2015, when it was split into the Tanganyika, Haut-Lomami, Lualaba, and Haut-Katanga provinces. Between 1971 and 1997 (during the rule of Mobutu Sese Seko when Congo was known as Zaire), its official name was Shaba Province.

Katanga's area encompassed . Farming and ranching are carried out on the Katanga Plateau. The eastern part of the province is considered to be a rich mining region, which supplies cobalt, copper, tin, radium, uranium, and diamonds. The region's former capital, Lubumbashi, is the second-largest city in the Congo.

History

Copper mining in Katanga dates back over 1,000 years, and mines in the region were producing standard-sized ingots of copper for international transport by the end of the 10th century CE.

In the 1890s, the province was beleaguered from the south by Cecil Rhodes' Northern Rhodesia, and from the north by the Belgian Congo, the personal possession of King Leopold II of Belgium. Msiri, the King of Katanga, held out against both, but eventually Katanga was subsumed by the Belgian Congo.

After 1900, the Societe Generale de Belgique practically controlled all of the mining in the province through Union Minière du Haut Katanga (UMHK). This included uranium, radium, copper, cobalt, zinc, cadmium, germanium, manganese, silver, gold, and tin.

In 1915, a deposit of pitchblende and other uranium minerals of a higher grade than had ever been found before anywhere in the world and higher than any found since were discovered at Shinkolobwe. The discovery was kept secret by UMHK. After World War I ended a factory was built at Olen; the secrecy was lifted at the end of 1922 with the announcement of the production of the first gram of radium from the pitchblende. By the start of World War II, the mining companies "constituted a state within the Belgian Congo". The Shinkolobwe mine near Jadotville (now Likasi) was at the centre of the Manhattan Project.

In 1960, after the Democratic Republic of the Congo (then called Republic of the Congo) gained independence from Belgium, the UMHK, Moise Tshombe and Godefroid Munongo supported the secession of Katanga province from the Congo. This was supported by Belgium but opposed by the Congolese Prime Minister Patrice Lumumba. This led to the assassination of Lumumba and the Katanga Crisis (or "Congo Crisis"), which lasted from 1960 to 1965. The breakaway State of Katanga existed from 1960 to 1963.

In 2005, the new constitution specified that Katanga was to be split up into separately administered provinces.

Militias such as Mai Mai Kata Katanga led by Gédéon Kyungu Mutanga fought for Katanga to secede, and his group briefly took over the provincial capital Lubumbashi in 2013.

In 2015, Katanga Province was split into the constitutional provinces of Tanganyika, Haut-Lomami, Lualaba, and Haut-Katanga.

Economy
Copper mining is an important part of the economy of Katanga province. Cobalt mining by individual contractors is also prevalent. A number of reasons have been advanced for the failure of the vast mineral wealth of the province to increase the overall standard of living. The local provincial budget was US$440 million in 2011.

Mining

Lubumbashi, the mining capital of the Democratic Republic of Congo, is a hub for many of the country's biggest mining companies. The Democratic Republic of Congo produces "more than 3 percent of the world’s copper and half its cobalt, most of which comes from Katanga".

Major mining concessions include Tilwezembe and Kalukundi.

Mining companies
Gécamines, (La Générale des Carrières et des Mines, the former UMHK), the state-owned copper-cobalt mining company, had monopoly concessions in the province.
Katanga Mining Ltd TSX:KAT operates a major mining complex in Katanga province, producing refined copper and cobalt with the "potential of becoming Africa’s largest copper producer and the world’s largest cobalt producer". Katanga Mining Ltd is majority-owned by Swiss commodity trader Glencore DCC. A joint venture of Katanga Mining (75%) and Gécamines (25%) began mining Tilwezembe, an open-pit copper and cobalt mine, in 2007.

Geography

The province bordered Angola and formed the entire Congolese border with Zambia. It also bordered Tanzania – although on Lake Tanganyika rather than on land. Katanga has a wet and dry season.

The province was divided in 2015 into five successor provinces, based on the districts of Katanga at that time:

Education and medical care
The University of Lubumbashi, located in the northern part of Lubumbashi city, is the largest university in the province and one of the largest in the country.

TESOL, the English Language School of Lubumbashi, is a secondary school that serves the expatriate community. It was founded in 1987 on the grounds of the French School, Lycée Français Blaise Pascal, which suspended operations in 1991 with a new French School starting in 2009.

Katanga province has the highest rate of infant mortality in the world, with 184 of 1000 babies born expected to die before the age of five.

Transportation
The Congo Railway provides Katanga Province with limited railway service centered on Lubumbashi. Reliability is limited. Lubumbashi International Airport is located northeast of Lubumbashi. In April 2014, a train derailment killed 63 people.

People 
Laurent-Désiré Kabila, former president of the Democratic Republic of the Congo
Moise Tshombe, former president of the breakaway State of Katanga
Barbara Kanam, popular singer
Frédéric Kibassa Maliba, former opposition leader and president of UDPS
Odilon Kafitwe wa pa Bowa, former national minister of Zaire and leader of UFERI
Lunda Bululu, former prime minister of Zaire
Godefroid Munongo, politician

See also

Central African Copperbelt
Congo Free State
Congo Pedicle
List of governors of Katanga
Lubumbashi history and timeline
Msiri
Stairs Expedition to Katanga
State of Katanga

References

External links

The United Nations and the Congo
WorldStatesmen- Congo (Kinshasa)
The Bank Notes of Katanga
Rush and Ruin: The Devastating Mineral Trade in Southern Katanga

 
Former provinces of the Democratic Republic of the Congo (1966–2015)
Haut-Lomami
Tanganyika Province
1966 establishments in the Democratic Republic of the Congo
2015 disestablishments in the Democratic Republic of the Congo
Provinces of the Belgian Congo